Potts Glacier is a steep glacier draining from the west slopes of Malta Plateau and flowing south to enter Mariner Glacier, in the Victory Mountains, Victoria Land. Mapped by United States Geological Survey (USGS) from surveys and U.S. Navy air photos, 1960–64. Named by Advisory Committee on Antarctic Names (US-ACAN) for Donald C. Potts, biologist at McMurdo Station, 1966–67.

Glaciers of Victoria Land
Borchgrevink Coast